Elachista martinii is a moth of the family Elachistidae that is found from Germany and Latvia to Italy and Greece. It is also found in Russia.

The larvae feed on Carex humilis. They mine the leaves of their host plant. The mine generally descends from the leaf tip down, but sometimes ascends from halfway up the leaf. The larvae leaves the mine around April and starts a new similar mine in another leaf. Most frass is deposited in the oldest part of the mine. Pupation takes place outside of the mine at the base of the mined leaf. They are yellow with a nearly colourless head. Larvae can be found from September to June.

References

martinii
Moths described in 1898
Moths of Europe